Rafaila is a commune in Vaslui County, Western Moldavia, Romania. It is composed of a single village, Rafaila. This was part of Todirești Commune until 2004, when it was split off.

References

Communes in Vaslui County
Localities in Western Moldavia